Blaina is a small town, situated deep within the South Wales Valleys between Brynmawr and Abertillery in the unitary authority of Blaenau Gwent, ancient parish of Aberystruth, preserved county of Gwent and historic county of Monmouthshire. The place name is derived from the Welsh word  "uplands". As of 2011, the town has a population of 4,808.

Welsh language
According to the 2011 Census, 6.3% of the ward's 4,808 (303 residents) resident-population can speak, read, and write Welsh. This is above the county's figure of 5.5% of 67,348 (3,705 residents) who can speak, read, and write Welsh.

Notable people
See also :Category:People from Blaina

Arthur Fear, opera singer
Parry Jones, opera singer
William Partridge, soldier, fought at Rorke's Drift
Raymond "Ray" Price, rugby union and rugby league footballer of the 1940s and 1950s for Abertillery RFC (RU), Great Britain (RL), Wales, Other Nationalities, Belle Vue Rangers, Warrington, and St. Helens
Kingsley Jones, rugby union flanker, coach
Frank Richards, author
Mike Ruddock, rugby coach
Florence Eleanor Soper, wife of Bramwell Booth, General of The Salvation Army
Mostyn Thomas, opera singer
David Watkins, Welsh rugby union and rugby league international
Emlyn Watkins, rugby union and rugby league footballer of the 1920s for Wales (RU), Blaina RFC, Wales (RL), and Leeds
Emlyn A G Watkins, George Medal recipient

References

External links
Blaina - Nantyglo homepage on the web
Kelly's Directory of Monmouthshire in 1901 on Blaina
Blaenau Gwent Council website on the local ironworks history
Welsh Coal Mines - research the local pit histories
www.geograph.co.uk : photos of Blaina and surrounding area
Blaina heritage web site

Towns in Blaenau Gwent
Geography of Blaenau Gwent